Hildebrando Pompeu Pinto Accioli (June 25, 1888 – April 4, 1962) was a Brazilian diplomat and on two occasions in 1947 and 1948 Minister of Foreign Affairs, in the absence of Chancellor Raul Fernandes.

Career 
In 1914, Hildebrando Accioli joined the diplomatic service. In 1924, he was first secretary in the permanent delegation to the League of Nations in Geneva.

In 1936, Hildebrando Accioli represented Brazil as minister at the Inter-American Conference for the Consolidation of Peace (Buenos Aires, 1936). In 1937, he was raised to the post of Secretary General of the Ministry of Foreign Affairs. In 1938, he headed the Brazilian delegation to the VIII Conference International American Countries, in Lima, when he was promoted to ambassador.

In 1946 Hildebrando Accioli returned to the post of general secretary of foreign affairs. He was delegate plenipotentiary to the Paris Peace Treaties, 1947. 

Between May and June 1947, and between September to December 1948, he was Brazilian Minister of Foreign Affairs ad interim. Until 1950, he was president of the Permanent Council of the Organization of American States. In 1950, he was the tenth Legal Adviser of the Ministry of Foreign Affairs.

Hildebrando Accioli retired from Brazilian politics in 1953.

In 1957, he joined the Permanent Court of Arbitration at The Hague.

Other activities
Professor of international law at the Law School of the Pontifical Catholic University of São Paulo and at the Rio Branco Institute
Member of the Brazilian Historic and Geographic Institute

References

1888 births
1962 deaths
Foreign ministers of Brazil
Ambassadors of Brazil to the Holy See
Members of the Permanent Court of Arbitration
Brazilian judges of international courts and tribunals